André Rocha may refer to:

 André Guerreiro Rocha, Brazilian soccer player who currently plays for Figueirense
André da Rocha, a municipality in the state Rio Grande do Sul, Brazil